Heydar Yaghma (1926 – March 1986) was an Iranian poet. He was born in a village near Nishapur. Yaghma was a simple worker and was not literate. He began telling poems while in his thirties and learned how to read and write.

He died in Nishapur and is buried beside the archeologic site of Shadiyakh there.

Poems

Most of his poems were unique in the field of his view. He disdained academic studies and idleness in his poems. He has described everything just through his rural simple view, that there had never been such those poems before.

See also

 Persian literature
 List of Persian poets and authors

External links
a weblog post about Heydar Yaghma.
Yaghma criticism in a magazin 

1926 births
1986 deaths
Iranian male poets
Poets from Nishapur
20th-century Iranian poets
20th-century male writers